Seticosta argentichroa is a species of moth of the family Tortricidae. It is found in Ecuador in the provinces of Loja and Azuay.

The wingspan is 17–18 mm. The ground colour of the forewings is silvery white, sprinkled and strigulated (finely streaked) with blackish grey. The markings are black, but grey black inside. The hindwings are white without strigulation and tinged pale brownish in the distal third.

Etymology
The species name refers to the colouration of the forewings and is derived from Latin argentum (meaning silver) and chroa (meaning complexion).

References

Moths described in 2004
Seticosta